The George Bonner Jr. House is a historic residence in Midway, Utah, United States, that is listed on the National Register of Historic Places.

Description
The house is located at 90 East Main Street (SR-113). It was built in 1877 and was designed and built by John Watkins. It is a one-and-a-half-story Gothic Revival-style house with decorative bargeboards. It has an L-shaped plan. A porch on the west side was replaced by a brick addition that served as a kitchen. A porch on the east side was enclosed to serve as an extra bedroom, in the 1960s. It has bay windows which originally had "fancy balconies".

It was listed on the National Register of Historic Places June 17, 1986.

See also

 National Register of Historic Places listings in Wasatch County, Utah
 George Bonner Sr. House
 William Bonner House

References

External links

Houses completed in 1877
Houses in Wasatch County, Utah
Gothic Revival architecture in Utah
Houses on the National Register of Historic Places in Utah
National Register of Historic Places in Wasatch County, Utah
1877 establishments in Utah Territory